U.S. Route 466 (US 466) was an east–west United States highway.  Though it reached a length of around 500 miles (805 km), the route was co-signed with other US routes for much of its length.  When California deleted most of its U.S. Highways in the mid-1960s, including US 466 in 1964, there was no longer a need for the designation.

The general route between Barstow and Kingman is now more directly served by Interstate 40.

The route is known for being the highway on which actor James Dean died in a car accident on September 30, 1955, at the intersection of CA 41 near Cholame, California.

Route description

California

US 466 began in Morro Bay, continuing to US 101 before turning north and following the path of today's SR 41 to Shandon in San Luis Obispo County. From there, US 466 followed the path of today's SR 46 east. At Famoso, US 466 joined US 99 and ran south to Bakersfield. From Bakersfield, U.S. Route 466 generally followed what is now the alignment of SR 58. Between Barstow, California and the Nevada line, the route followed the path of today's Interstate 15 and was co-signed with U.S. Route 91.

Nevada
U.S. Route 466 entered Nevada at Primm. It headed north concurrent with U.S. Route 91 to Las Vegas, where the route followed Las Vegas Boulevard. In downtown Las Vegas, US 466 turned east on Fremont Street with U.S. Route 93 (and later, U.S. Route 95).  The two routes followed Fremont Street and Boulder Highway heading southeast through Henderson and Boulder City towards the Arizona state line on Hoover Dam.

Arizona

From the Nevada line on Hoover Dam, U.S. Route 466 remained co-signed with US 93 as it headed southeast.  The highway reached its eastern terminus in Kingman where it connected to the old U.S. Route 66.

History
US 466 was commissioned in 1935, extending from U.S. Route 66 in Kingman, Arizona to the Pacific Ocean at Morro Bay, California. Between Las Vegas, Nevada and Barstow, California, the route was co-signed with U.S. Route 91. In 1951, the U.S. Route 93 designation was extended to include the section of US 466 from its eastern terminus at Kingman, Arizona to the US 91 junction in Las Vegas, Nevada.  This left the California segment as the only section of the route not co-signed with another route.

In 1964, California deleted the US 466 designation.  Arizona eliminated the designation in 1969.  When Nevada followed suit in 1971, the route ceased to exist.

Major intersections

See also

References

 Endpoints of US highways: US 466 (II)

External links

California @ AARoads.com - U.S. Route 466
California Highways: US 466

66-4
66-4
66-4
466
66-4
4
66-4